One Liberty Plaza, formerly the U.S. Steel Building, is a skyscraper in the Financial District of Lower Manhattan in New York City. It is situated on a block bounded by Broadway, Liberty Street, Church Street, and Cortlandt Street, on the sites of the former Singer Building and City Investing Building.

The building was designed in the International Style by Skidmore, Owings & Merrill and completed in 1973. At , each floor offers almost  of office space, making it one of the largest office buildings in New York by usable interior space. Its facade is black, consisting of a structural steel frame. South of the building is Zuccotti Park, formerly called Liberty Plaza Park.

One Liberty Plaza was originally commissioned by U.S. Steel, and also housed the headquarters of Merrill Lynch. A variety of tenants occupy the space, from large law firms to public and not-for-profit agencies like the Lower Manhattan Development Corporation and the World Trade Center Memorial Foundation as well as new businesses. Since 2001 One Liberty Plaza has been owned and operated by Brookfield Properties.

History 

The Singer Building, the tallest in the world from 1908 to 1909, and the City Investing Building adjacent to it were demolished from 1967 to 1968 to clear land for One Liberty Plaza's construction. One Liberty Plaza had more than twice the interior area of the two former buildings combined.

The building had a substantial renovation in 1989, which involved the creation of a new lobby and elevator system. The lobby and elevators have an extensive security system, and the building has a connection to the New York City Subway's Fulton Street/Fulton Center station in the basement.

In 2001, Brookfield Properties bought the property for $432 million. Following the September 11 attacks, and the subsequent collapse of the World Trade Center nearby, One Liberty Plaza sustained significant facade damage. Hundreds of windows that had been blown out on its western facade needed to be replaced, and heavy dust and debris needed to be removed from the floors and equipment on the roof. An outside area on the street beside Brooks Brothers on the ground floor of the building was used as a temporary morgue in the days following the attack. At one point there was a rumor going around that the building was in danger of collapse. These claims were quickly refuted by the New York Times:

The building was planned to be reopened to office workers with a ribbon cutting ceremony on October 22, 2001. But the day before it was to happen, it was decided that it was not yet sufficiently safe for employees to return to the office tower. The tower reopened on October 24, two days after originally scheduled.

, it was the 656th tallest building in the world.

In December 2017, Brookfield sold a 49% stake in the tower to Blackstone, valuing the tower at $1.55 billion. The sale of the minority stake followed the refinancing of the building in August 2017 with a $784 million loan from Morgan Stanley.

Tenants
One Liberty Plaza is a hub of Wall Street activity, housing RBC Capital Markets' trading floors.  Major tenants are New Avon (2 floors), the Lower Manhattan Development Corporation, and the international law firm Cleary Gottlieb Steen & Hamilton (531 attorneys on 11 floors). It also houses the corporate headquarters of Empire Blue Cross Blue Shield (part of Anthem), Investment Technology Group, and insurance companies Arch Insurance Group,  Sirius America, Mutual of America, Swiss Re, Generali, and Allianz and its subsidiaries Fireman's Fund and Interstate/Chicago.

The following is a list of the tenants by floor:

See also
 List of tallest buildings in New York City
 List of tallest buildings in the United States

References

External links

 
 One Liberty Plaza on CTBUH
 One Liberty Plaza on Emporis
 One Liberty Plaza on Skyscraperpage.com
 One Liberty Plaza on Structurae

1970s architecture in the United States
Broadway (Manhattan)
Financial District, Manhattan
Office buildings completed in 1973
Privately owned public spaces
Skidmore, Owings & Merrill buildings
1 Liberty Plaza
U.S. Steel